Lee Ar-tu (born 10 August 1938) is a Taiwanese sprinter. He competed in the men's 100 metres at the 1964 Summer Olympics.

References

1938 births
Living people
Athletes (track and field) at the 1964 Summer Olympics
Taiwanese male sprinters
Olympic athletes of Taiwan
Place of birth missing (living people)